Peter June Libo-on Simon (born June 1, 1980) is a Filipino former professional basketball player. He has formerly played in the Philippine Basketball Association, playing for 16 years with the Magnolia Hotshots franchise. Simon was drafted 43rd overall in the 2001 PBA draft by the Sta. Lucia Realtors. His moniker is Scoring Apostle.

Amateur career

College career
Simon was relatively unknown in the Philippine college basketball scene. But to hardcore basketball fans, and especially the Mindanao-based fans, Simon was one of the biggest collegiate basketball heroes in Davao. Born in Makilala, Cotabato, he built his reputation as one of the fiercest and most exciting basketball warriors down south by joining in various competitions and leaving his marks on them. He collected three MVP trophies in the collegiate leagues in Davao City and reigned five times as the Sultan of Slams.

Metropolitan Basketball Association
Having created a status in various collegiate and commercial leagues in Mindanao, Simon was easily handpicked to be a part of the Davao Eagles in the Metropolitan Basketball Association. Although his career with the Eagles did not start well, he caught fire as the 2001 MBA First Phase progressed. He was at the forefront of the Eagles onslaught in several games. He once sparked a fourth-quarter rally to upset the league-leading Negros Slashers. He engaged with Laguna Lakers' Biboy Simon in a fiery shootout and at the same time registering his career-high 25 points. Coming off the bench, he scored a new career-high 28 points as they outclassed Nueva Ecija Patriots during which he made five Blitz Three baskets in the game. In his best outing as an Eagle, Simon fired yet another new career-high 41 points as he was simply unstoppable.

At the end of the season, Simon's hard work and heroics on the court paid off as he was named as the Discovery Player of the Year.

Also, while playing in the MBA, he became a member of the Philippine national basketball team. In his first stint with the national team, PJ Simon scored 14 points to backup Reynel Hugnatan as the MBA All-Stars opened its 25th William Jones Cup campaign on a high note, tripping the much taller Russian club Lokomotive Novosibirsk, 78–68, at the Taipei Physical Education College Gym.

Philippine Basketball League
Following the disbandment of the MBA in July 2002, Simon was immediately enlisted by Dazz Dishwashing Liquid, the Lamoiyan Corporation's Philippine Basketball League franchise. In no time, he created a big mark in the star-studded 2002–03 PBL Challenge Cup. For his efforts, PJ Simon was selected into the Second Mythical Team during the Individual Players Achievement Awards. He also helped the team barge into the Finals. In his first PBL Finals appearance, PJ Simon led Dazz in a losing cause by scoring 18 points as they surrendered to the Welcoat Paintmasters in overtime in Game 1 at the Quezon Convention Center in Lucena City.

Although Dazz failed to win the title, a change of the team's name had boded well for the Lamoiyan franchise's fortunes. Hapee Toothpaste opened its championship run in the 2003 Sunkist PBL Unity Cup by defeating Viva Mineral Water behind the blazing guns of PJ Simon and Ryan Dy. Then in the deciding Game 5 of Unity Cup finals, Hapee rode again on the heroics of PJ Simon to capture the crown. For that, he and teammate Rich Alvarez were later awarded by the PBL Press Corps as co-Final MVPs.

In the 2003 PBL-CBF Dual Meet Finals, he and Allan Salangsang combined for 35 points off the bench as they powered Fash Liquid to beat Grachiya Energy Boosters, 86–76, at the Cebu Coliseum.

The following conference, PJ Simon edged out other illustrious cagers to bag the 2003–04 PBL Platinum Cup MVP with the print, radio, and TV media solidly rallying behind him. Joining PJ Simon in the Mythical Team were Jojo Tangkay, Fash teammate Rich Alvarez, and future Purefoods teammates James Yap and Ervin Sotto. He also led his team in another title, beating the Welcoat Paintmasters in a hotly contested five-game series.

Professional career

Magnolia Hotshots (2004–2020)

While still playing for Fash in the PBL, Purefoods offered him a two-year contract as a rookie free agent. He was actually drafted by the Sta. Lucia Realtors as the 43rd overall pick in the 2001 PBA draft. He toiled for a while in the MBA and PBL where he further enhanced his skills.

But like his stints in the MBA and PBL, his PBA career did not start hot as he played behind fellow star rookie James Yap. In Purefoods' seventh game in the 2004–05 Philippines Cup, however, PJ got his game going as he led Purefoods in a come-from-behind win over Alaska, by scoring four of his team-high 18 points in the final eleven seconds of the game.

In his first three seasons in the PBA, PJ Simon only showed flashes of his brilliance far and wide. In the 2007 PBA Fiesta Cup, he was named Accel PBA Player of the Week for the period May 6 to 13. He came up with a team-high 22 points in a game against Coke on May 4  then on May 13, he exploded for PBA career-high 31 points and also grabbed 10 rebounds to lead Purefoods in routing Ginebra, 117–105.

The 2007–08 season proved to be the coming-out party for Simon. While he was still in the giant shadow of his more famous teammates, he created his niche by being the "super sub" for his team. As Purefoods set a franchise-record of 7–0 to start a season, he was the biggest hero in two of those wins. He scored 15 of his game-high 27 points in the first quarter to lead Purefoods to its fifth straight win as they massacred Ginebra, 103–76, on November 4, 2007.

Then ten days later, he once more top-scored for Purefoods by making 22 points in their 100–81 rout of Air21, tying the franchise's best to start in the All-Filipino Cup.

In the Finals, Simon had four scintillating games. Purefoods lost, however, to Sta. Lucia in seven games. But nevertheless, PJ Simon averaged 13.3 points to firmly establish himself as Purefoods' primary offensive option off the bench.

Owing to his impressive performance in the 2007–08 PBA Philippine Cup, he was selected in a reserve role to take part in the 2008 All-Star Game held in Bacolod City. Simon did not disappoint the fans, as although he only played for 20 minutes, he scored 29 points on 11-of-14 field goals and 4-of-4 on the free-throw line to tow the South team in a thrilling victory in overtime over the North squad, 163–158. With that, he was cited as the Most Valuable Player, his first major PBA award.

In the 2009–10 Philippine Cup Finals, Purefoods swept Alaska, 4–0, to be crowned 2009–2010 PBA Philippine Cup champions.

The Llamados entered the 2010–11 PBA Philippine Cup as defending champions. In the first round of the tournament, Simon averaged 17.4 points per game, while the team ended the Classification Phase with a 7–7 record. On November 10, 2010, Simon scored a career-high 42 points against the Air21 Express. Him and two-time MVP James Yap led the team to the quarter-finals, in which the Llamados scored back-to-back wins against the Meralco Bolts. For the series, Simon averaged 29.0 points and his contributions helped the Llamados to overcome Meralco in two games. However, they couldn't keep up the momentum in the semi-finals after losing to the Talk 'N Text Tropang Texters in six games.

The 2011–12 season saw Simon and his team, B-Meg, being favorites in winning possibly the Grand Slam title with their new coach being the legendary coach Tim Cone. Simon helped the Llamados to a 10–4 win–loss record in the 2011–12 Philippine Cup, but unfortunately, the Llamados were knocked out in the quarterfinals after an upset by the Powerade Tigers led by Gary David. After being upset in the Philippine Cup, B-Meg decided to keep their roster from the Philippine Cup intact. Their only addition to the roster is their import Denzel Bowles, who eventually won the Best Import of the Conference. Bowles helped the team to a 3rd-place finish in the elimination round. B-Meg was able to win the quarterfinal series against Meralco and the semis against rivals Barangay Ginebra. Simon and Co. faced the Talk 'N Text Tropang Texters in the final, where they won the series in seven games. Going into the Governors' Cup, B-Meg gained confidence following their championship in the Commissioner's Cup, but they lost to Rain or Shine in seven games. Simon averaged 12.0 points per game on 47% field goal shooting.

Simon played a total of 64 games in the 2012–13 season, a career-high for him at the time. Although, Simon and his teammates were not able to make the finals in the first two conferences, being knocked out in the semi-finals in the Philippine Cup and Commissioner's Cup. In the Governors' Cup, they made a finals appearance and became the eventual champion, beating its sister team Petron Blaze Boosters in a tightly contested seven-game series. Simon averaged 12.8 points in 28.0 minutes of action in 64 games.

The 2013–14 PBA season was probably the best season for Simon. Aside of him and the Mixers winning a rare Grand Slam in the 2013–14 season, he was a part of the PBA Second Mythical Team along with teammate Marc Pingris, Paul Lee, Sonny Thoss, and Rookie of the Year Greg Slaughter. Simon was also awarded 2013–14 PBA Mr. Quality Minutes by the PBA Press Corps Simon and also scored the most 2-point shots and the most number of total points among other players during the 2013–14 season. Thanks to his great performance off the bench, playing in a new career high 66 games and playing at an average of 28.4 minutes per game and scoring 13.5 points per game, he was a vital part of San Mig's Grand Slam season. Despite finishing the elimination round of all the three conferences at a combined 18–18 win–loss record, with their Commissioner's Cup record at 4–5, a losing record, they still cruised past their opponents, with Simon being a vital part of the offense, providing outside shooting off the bench.

PBA career statistics

Season-by-season averages

|-
| align="left" | 
| align="left" | Purefoods
| 62 || 14.9 || .448 || .309 || .744 || 1.7 || 1.0 || .3 || .1 || 6.2
|-
| align="left" | 
| align="left" | Purefoods
| 28 || 9.6 || .383 || .258 || .805 || 1.0 || .4 || .2 || 0 || 4.4
|-
| align="left" | 
| align="left" | Purefoods
| 39 || 21.6 || .476 || .443 || .798 || 3.1 || 1.1 || .4 || .1 || 12.4
|-
| align="left" | 
| align="left" | Purefoods
| 50 || 22.7 || .470 || .304 || .737 || 2.5 || .8 || .5 || .1 || 13.4
|-
| align="left" | 
| align="left" | Purefoods
| 27 || 24.7 || .498 || .366 || .728 || 2.4 || .9 || .4 || .1 || 14.5
|-
| align="left" | 
| align="left" | Purefoods / B-Meg
| 52 || 13.4 || .399 || .333 || .698 || 1.2 || .8 || .1 || .1 || 5.6
|-
| align="left" | 
| align="left" | B-Meg
| 42 || 31.6 || .506 || .372 || .771 || 3.4 || 1.6 || .4 || .1  || 17.1
|-
| align="left" | 
| align="left" | B-Meg
| 58 || 30.6 || .479 || .323 || .733 || 3.9 ||  1.5 || .6 || .3 || 12.0
|-
| align="left" | 
| align="left" | San Mig Coffee
| 64 || 28.0 || .463 || .321 || .767 || 3.4 || 1.3 || .3 || .1 || 12.8
|-
| align="left" | 
| align="left" | San Mig Super Coffee
| 66 || 28.4 || .479 || .358 || .722 || 3.4 || 1.6 || .4 || .1 || 13.5
|-
| align="left" | 
| align="left" | Purefoods / Star
| 41 || 21.5 || .489 || .377 || .765 || 2.1 || .7 || .3 || .0 || 9.9
|-
| align="left" | 
| align="left" | Star
| 36 || 26.0 || .466 || .454 || .783 || 2.3 || 1.2 || .3 || .1 || 12.7
|-
| align="left" | 
| align="left" | Star
| 46 || 12.9 || .426 || .340 || .778 || 1.5 || .9 || .1 || .1 || 5.9
|-
| align="left" | 
| align="left" | Magnolia
| 49 || 10.8 || .430 || .425 || .691 || 1.1 || .4 || .2 || .0 || 5.9
|-
| align="left" | 
| align="left" | Magnolia
| 26 || 6.9 || .413 || .297 || .889 || .7 || .4 || .1 || .0 || 3.1
|-
| align="left" | 
| align="left" | Magnolia
| 1 || 11.4 || .667 || .000 || .000 || .0 || .0 || .0 || .0 || 4.0
|-class=sortbottom
| align=center colspan=2 | Career
| 687 || 21.0 || .467 || .357 || .753 || 2.4 || 1.0 || .3 || .1 || 10.1

Personal life
Simon is the youngest in the brood of three of Pedro Simon, Jr., a teacher and the late Cristina. He is the only athlete in the family, although his father played some basketball but not in the commercial leagues. After his mother succumbed to cancer, his father remarried. From his father and stepmother Flor, Simon has a half-brother and a half-sister.

His older siblings are Maricris and Anthony, both have families of their own and are based in North Cotabato.

Simon is a member of Victory Christian Fellowship.
 
Along with close friend and Purefoods teammate James Yap, Simon guested at ABS-CBN's Pinoy Big Brother on April 23, 2008.

References

External links
PeterJuneSimon.com – Official Website
Peter June Simon's PBA.ph profile
Creative Work 4 Purefoods

1980 births
Living people
Basketball players from Davao City
Filipino Christians
Filipino men's basketball players
Magnolia Hotshots players
People from Cotabato
Philippine Basketball Association All-Stars
Philippine Basketball Association players with retired numbers
Shooting guards
Sta. Lucia Realtors draft picks
UM Wildcats basketball players